Jordan Black (born Gary Andre McCrory; November 9, 1970) is an American comedy writer and actor.

Life and career
Black was born in Kankakee, Illinois. He has written for Saturday Night Live and starred in the Comedy Central show Halfway Home as Sebastian "C-Bass" Yates, an ex-convict for internet fraud. He voiced Sullivan Carrew in the 2004 mockumentary The Old Negro Space Program. He also appeared as himself in a 2003 episode of MADtv.

Black is also an alumnus of The Groundlings, a Los Angeles-based improvisational and sketch comedy troupe and theatre. Although he retired from the theatre's Main Stage Company in the mid-2000s, Black still comes back regularly to perform in The Groundlings’ all-improv shows The Crazy Uncle Joe Show and Cookin' with Gas, and is also a teacher at the groundlings. He has made cameos on the NBC television show Community as the dean of City Community College, Steven Spreck, and on the CBS sitcom How I Met Your Mother. He appeared in ''Sarah Cooper: Everything's Fine in 2020.

References

External links

ComedyCentral.com profile

1970 births
Male actors from Illinois
Living people
People from Kankakee, Illinois